Toto of Arabia is a 1965 Italian-Spanish adventure-comedy film directed by . It is a parody of Lawrence of Arabia and of spy films.

Plot 
Toto, a former Italian military service who works  as a  servant at the British Intelligence Service, is promoted to secret agent with the name of Agent 00Ø8 in order to convince the ruler of Shamara, Sheikh Ali El Buzur, to yield oil to UK.

Cast 

 Totò: Agent 00Ø8 Toto 
 Nieves Navarro: Doris
 Fernando Sancho: Sheikh Ali el Buzur
 George Rigaud: Sir Bains
 Mario Castellani:  Omar el Bedù
 Luigi Pavese: Sheikh Ali di Shamara
 Luis Cuenca: El Kasser
 Víctor Israel: Boris

References

External links

1965 films
Italian parody films
Spanish comedy films
Films directed by José Antonio de la Loma
1960s spy comedy films
1960s parody films
Films shot in Almería
Films with screenplays by Giovanni Grimaldi
1965 comedy films
1960s Italian-language films
1950s Italian films
1960s Italian films